Úrsula Heinze de Lorenzo (born in Cologne, Germany on 18 June 1941) is a writer and translator in Galician and German residing in Galicia. Her extensive literary works include poetry, novels, essays, short stories and children's literature. She moved from Germany to Galicia in 1968.  She has worked for the Radio Galega Compañía de Radio Televisión de Galicia and El Correo Gallego and is a former president of the PEN club of Galicia.

References 

Writers from Galicia (Spain)
Writers from Cologne
1941 births
Living people
Spanish writers in German
20th-century Spanish writers
21st-century Spanish writers
Galician-language writers
German women writers
Women writers from Galicia (Spain)
German translators
20th-century Spanish women